Jeffrey Kipnis (born 1951, Georgia) is an American architectural critic, theorist, designer, film-maker, curator, and educator.

Education, honors, and career
Not a registered architect, Kipnis first came to prominence through his association with Bahram Shirdel, and Peter Eisenman (and their joint collaboration with French philosopher Jacques Derrida). Kipnis holds a master's degree in physics from Georgia State University, USA (1981), and in 2006, he was awarded an honorary diploma by the Architectural Association School of Architecture, London, in recognition of his contributions to the discipline of architecture as a teacher, critic, and theorist. Other honors include the AIA (Georgia Chapter) Bronze Medal for Service to Architecture (1985), a Professional Development Award from the Architectural Society of Ohio Foundation (1992), and an Ohio State University Distinguished Research Award (2005). He is professor of architecture at the Ohio State University, Columbus, Ohio, USA. He has been a visiting professor at Princeton University, New Jersey, Columbia University, New York, the Southern California Institute of Architecture, Los Angeles, the Harvard University Graduate School of Design, Cambridge, and a guest professor of Urban Strategies - a postgraduate program at the Institute of Architecture (IoA), University of Applied Arts Vienna (Angewandte Kunst). Kipnis taught at the Architectural Association from 1992 to 1995, where he was the founding director of the Graduate Design Program. He also curates Architecture and Design at the Wexner Center for the Arts in Columbus, Ohio. As a critic he has written for many different periodicals, including Assemblage, El Croquis, Architectural Design, Harvard Design Magazine, Log, and Quaderns.

Designer
As a designer, Kipnis collaborated with architects Reiser + Umemoto (RUR Architects) on the Water Garden in Columbus, Ohio (which won a 1998 PA Design Award) and the Kansai-kan National Diet Library. During the 1990s he collaborated with the Iranian architect Bahram Shirdel on the design of influential projects such as the Scottish National Museum, Montreal Urban Design 1990-2000, and Place Jacques Cartier.

Select bibliography 
 Kipnis, Jeffrey. In The Manor of Nietzsche, Calluna Farms Press, New York, 1990.
 Kipnis, Jeffrey and Thomas Leeser (ed), Chora L Works: Jacques Derrida and Peter Eisenman, New York, Monacelli Press, 1997.
 Kipnis, Jeffrey. "Twisting the Separatrix," in K. Michael Hays (ed), Architectural Theory Since 1968, Cambridge, MIT Press, 1998. [originally published in Assemblage 14, 1992).
 Kipnis, Jeffrey and Philip Johnson, "A Conversation around the Avant-Garde" in Robert Somol (ed), Autonomy and Ideology: Positioning an Avant-garde in America, New York, Monacelli Press, 1997.
 Kipnis, Jeffrey. "Against Two Gravities," in Get Off of My Cloud: The Texts of Coop Himmelblau 1968-2005, Hatje Cantz, 2005.
 Kipnis, Jeffrey. "What we need here is -- failure to communicate!!" Quaderns 245 (April 2005): 94-100.
 Kipnis, Jeffrey. "Some Thoughts on Contemporary Paintings in the Hope that Analogies to Architecture Might be Drawn." Hunch 9, Rotterdam, 2005.
 Kipnis, Jeffey. "The Cunning of Cosmetics." Herzog & de Meuron: El Croquis 84, Madrid, Spain, 1997.
 Kipnis, Jeffey. "Toward a New Architecture." AD: Folding and Pliancy, Academy Editions, London, 1993.
 Kipnis, Jeffey. "Architecture:  The Sacred and the Suspect." Journal of Architectural Education, ACSA, Washington DC, 1987.
 Kipnis, Jeffey. "Drawing a Conclusion." Perspecta 22, MIT Press, Cambridge, Mass., 1986.

References 

Faculty page at Ohio State 
Interview with Jeffrey Kipnis
 (partial bibliography)
Page at Quiz Bowl Wiki

1951 births
Living people
American architecture writers
American male non-fiction writers
Architectural theoreticians
Deconstructivism
Harvard University staff
Georgia State University alumni
Ohio State University faculty
Writers from Georgia (U.S. state)